Rear Admiral David William Maurice Boyle, 9th Earl of Glasgow,  (24 July 1910 – 8 June 1984), was a British nobleman and a Royal Navy officer. He was Chief of the Name and Arms of Boyle.

Naval career 
Educated at Eton College, Boyle entered the Royal Navy and fought in the Second World War during which he was awarded the Distinguished Service Cross. Promoted to captain in 1952, he became Captain of the Fleet, Home Fleet, in March 1957, Commodore, Royal Naval Barracks, Portsmouth, in September 1959 and Flag Officer, Malta, in July 1961. He retired in 1963 as a rear admiral.

Family 
In 1937 he married Dorothea Lyle (1914–2006), and had three children with her:
Patrick Robin Archibald Boyle, 10th Earl of Glasgow
Lady Sarah Dorothea Boyle
Lady Nichola Jane Eleanora Boyle

He divorced his first wife in 1962 and remarried the same year to Ursula Vanda Maud Vivian (1912–1984), daughter of the 4th Baron Vivian.

References

External links 

1910 births
1984 deaths
People educated at Eton College
Earls of Glasgow
Scottish clan chiefs
David
Companions of the Order of the Bath
Recipients of the Distinguished Service Cross (United Kingdom)
Deputy Lieutenants of Ayrshire
20th-century Scottish businesspeople